Vela (AK-89) was never commissioned and thus never bore the USS designation. The ship was transferred to the Army to become the Engineer Port Repair Ship Joe C. Specker shortly after launching. She was one of two such repair ships transferred to Navy in 1952 and served as the civilian crewed, unarmed USNS Vela (T-AK-89).

Construction 

The ship was a Maritime Commission type N3-M-A1 cargo vessel hull (MC hull 652) and was assigned the name MV Charles A. Ranlett. Her construction was transferred to Navy supervision on 1 January 1943 and she was subsequently laid down as Vela (AK-89) on 5 June 1944 at Camden, New Jersey, by the Penn-Jersey Shipbuilding Corporation. The ship was launched on 15 January 1945 sponsored by Mrs. Elbert Bradford Ferguson.

Transfer to Army 
Two days after launch, on 17 January 1945, the ship was transferred to the U.S. Army for conversion into the Engineer Port Repair Ship Joe C. Specker for operation by the U.S. Army Corps of Engineers rehabilitating war damaged ports. Her name was struck from the Navy list on 8 February 1945. The Army named her for Medal of Honor recipient Joe C. Specker of the 48th Engineer Combat Battalion.

Unlike most port repair ships the Joe C. Specker, among the last two ships (See: Marvin Lyle Thomas) converted and seeing no actual war service as a port repair ship, spent seven postwar years in Army service before transfer Navy.

Transfer To Navy 
On 11 June 1952, Vela was transferred to the MSTS and placed in service at Baltimore, Maryland the following day and was reinstated on the Navy list on 22 August. She operated out of New York City through 1958, ranging from Canadian coastal waters to the Caribbean on supply missions.

Later transferred to the Maritime Administration and placed in the National Defense Reserve Fleet, she was berthed in the Hudson River until she was sold on 23 November 1970 to Hierros Ardes, S.A., Spain, and scrapped.

Notes

References

External links 
 NavSource Online: Service Ship Photo Archive - T-AK-89 Vela - USAT Joe C. Specker
 United States Army in World War II - The Corps of Engineers: Troops and Equipment - Chapter XVII - Preparing to Reconstruct Ports
 The Corps of Engineers: The War Against Germany: CHAPTER XVI Developing Beaches and Reconstructing Ports
 Popular Science, October 1944: How Seagoing Shops Clear Captured Ports (illustrations)

 

Port repair ships of the United States Army
Enceladus-class cargo ships
Ships built in Camden, New Jersey
1945 ships
Type N3 ships of the United States Army
World War II auxiliary ships of the United States